The MINI Beachcomber is a concept car presented by Mini at the 2010 North American International Auto Show as a preview of the Countryman crossover.

The Beachcomber has an open body concept, which according to the brand is supposed to offer an ultimate expression of freedom in a car. The concept is also a comeback to the Mini Moke, which was a symbol of adventurous motoring back in the 1960s.

The Mini concept comes with a newly developed all-wheel drive drivetrain and several body elements which serve to make the car extra-strong and robust and also to give it an elevated seating position.

In  order to protect its occupants from wind and rain the concept car features a soft-top roof. This protection can be completely removed from the body and stored in a container. There is also the possibility of using hardtop panels made of an extra-light plastic material, which protect the roof, the sides of the car and the rear storage compartment.

External links 
 Mini concepts page

Beachcomber
Concept cars